Salkić is a Bosnian surname. Notable people with the surname include:

Edin Salkić (born 1989), Austrian and Bosnian footballer
Erik Salkić (born 1987), Slovenian footballer of Bosnian descent
Mervana Jugić-Salkić (born 1980), Bosnian former tennis player

Bosnian surnames
Patronymic surnames